Blund's Lullaby is a 2017 Swedish two-minute-long horror short film directed, produced and written by Magda Lindblom and Amanda Nilsson. The short film is set in The Conjuring Universe and was made for the "My Annabelle Creation" contest which it won for Sweden. It was released September 14, 2017, on YouTube. Its plot concerns John Blund, the Nordic version of the Sandman that haunts a little girl  going to sleep.

Production
The short film stars Agnes and Mathilda Melin.

References

External links
 Blund's Lullaby on YouTube
 

The Conjuring Universe
2017 short films
Horror short films